The 2016 mid-year rugby union internationals (also known as the summer internationals in the Northern Hemisphere) are international rugby union matches that were mostly played in the Southern Hemisphere during the June international window.

The matches were part of World Rugby's global rugby calendar (2012–19) that included Test matches between the touring Northern Hemisphere nations and the home Southern Hemisphere nations, whilst some of the touring teams played mid-week matches against provincial or regional sides. In addition to this, the global calendar gave Tier 2 nations the opportunity to host Tier 1 nations outside the November international window, intended to increase competitiveness from the Tier 2 sides.

All Six Nations teams were in action. The grand slam winners England played a three-test series against Rugby Championship champions Australia. South Africa hosted a three-test series against Ireland, while Wales toured New Zealand, where they played the a three-test series against the world champions, and played a mid-week match against the Chiefs. Wales also played a single match against England for the Old Mutual Wealth Cup before travelling to New Zealand. Argentina hosted Italy, before they played a two-test series against France, whilst Italy played Canada and the United States.

2019 World Cup hosts Japan hosted Scotland for a two-test series, whilst they also played away to Canada in a first ever rugby union Test match at BC Place. Russia toured North America for the first time sonce 2010, playing tests against both Canada and the United States.

Georgia traveled to the Pacific Islands, where Fiji and Samoa each hosted the Lelos for the first time; Georgia also faced Tonga at a neutral venue in Fiji. Brazil hosted Kenya, the first time Brazil had hosted an African nation.

Overview

Series

Other tours

Fixtures

Notes:
 In this uncapped match, World Rugby trialed the new 6-point try, 2-point penalty law, while a penalty try is an automatic 8 points.

Notes:
 In this uncapped match, World Rugby trialed the new 6-point try, 2-point penalty law, while a penalty try is an automatic 8 points.

Notes:
 Ollie Devoto, Ellis Genge, Teimana Harrison and Tommy Taylor (all England) made their international debuts.

Notes:
 This was the first time that Samoa has hosted Georgia in a home test match.
 Talaga Alofipo, Malu Falaniko, Seilala Lam, Nu'uuli Lene, Jeff Lepa, D'angelo Leuila, Albert Nikoro, Dwayne Polataivao and Danny Tusitala (all Samoa) made their international debuts.

Notes:
 Alun Wyn Jones became the fifth Welsh player to earn his 100th cap.
 Ardie Savea and Seta Tamanivalu (both New Zealand) and Ellis Jenkins (Wales) made their international debuts.
 There was no replacement issued for George North when he was taken off injured at the end of the game, Wales played with 14 players.

Notes:
 Rory Arnold, Nick Frisby, Samu Kerevi and Dane Haylett-Petty (all Australia) made their international debuts.
 Mike Brown (England) earned his 50th test cap.
 England win back-to-back tests in Australia for the first time since 2003, while winning in Brisbane for the first time ever.
 The 39 points scored by England, are the most points scored by England against Australia.

Notes:
 Faf de Klerk (South Africa) made his international debut.
 This was Ireland's first ever victory over South Africa in South Africa.

Notes:
 Tommaso Boni and Sami Panico (both Italy) made their international debuts.

Notes:
 Matt Heaton (Canada) and Yoshiya Hosoda, Rikiya Matsuda, Mifiposeti Paea, Yasutaka Sasakura and Kaito Shigeno (all Japan) made their international debuts.

Notes:
 Ellis Jenkins was named to start, but was withdrawn from the team after failing to recover from injury and was replaced with Sam Warburton.
 Bench players Gareth Anscombe and Ross Moriarty were pulled out of the team moments before kick-off due to injury and replaced with Taulupe Faletau and Jamie Roberts.

Notes:
 Wayne Ngaluafe (Tonga) made his international debut.

Notes:
 Israel Dagg and Ben Smith (New Zealand) earned their 50th test caps.

Notes:
 Chris Robshaw (England) earned his 50th test cap.
 England retain the Cook Cup for the third consecutive time.
 England win their first ever test-series against Australia.
 England win their third consecutive match against Australia in Australia, the first time they have done this.

Notes:
 Ruan Combrinck and Franco Mostert (both South Africa) and Tiernan O'Halloran, Sean Reidy and Quinn Roux (all Ireland) made their international debuts.

Notes:
 Matt Tierney (Canada) and Konstantin Uzunov (Russia) made their international debuts.

Notes:
 Nate Augspurger, Tony Lamborn and Angus MacLellan (all United States) and Tommaso Castello, Maxime Mbanda and Sebastian Negri (all Italy) made their international debuts.

Notes:
 Rémi Bonfils, William Demotte, Kevin Gourdon, Julien Le Devedec, Clément Maynadier, Fabrice Metz, Xavier Mignot, Lucas Pointud, Julien Rey and Baptiste Serin (all France) made their international debuts.

Notes:
 Mesake Doge and Savenaca Rawaca (both Fiji) made their international debuts.
 This was Georgia's first ever win over Fiji.
 With this win, Georgia has beaten all 12 tier 2 nations.

Notes:
 Elliot Dixon, Liam Squire and Ofa Tu'ungafasi (all New Zealand) made their international debuts.
 Brodie Retallick and Aaron Smith (both New Zealand) earned their 50th test caps.

Notes:
 Adam Coleman (Australia) made his international debut.
 England score their most points against Australia in Australia, surpassing the 39 points scored in the first test of this test series.
 Australia lose 3–0 for the first time since they lost their three-test series to South Africa in 1971.

Notes:
 Huw Jones (Scotland) made his international debut.
 The 34,073 crowd was a record home crowd for a Japanese rugby international.

Notes:
 Steven Kitshoff, Jaco Kriel and Bongi Mbonambi (all South Africa) and Matt Healy (Ireland) made their international debuts.
 Conor Murray (Ireland) earned his 50th test cap.
 This was Eoin Reddan's last international after announcing his retirement from the professional game.
 

Notes:
 Kélian Galletier (France) made his international debut.
 Lucas González Amorosino (Argentina) earned his 50th test cap.
 Xavier Mignot was named to start, but was replaced with Hugo Bonneval before kick-off due to injury.
 This is the first time Argentina has failed to score any points in a test match since they lost 16–0 against Ireland in 2007. It is the first time they have failed to score any points against France since their first ever meeting in 1949.

Notes:
 Langilangi Haupeakui, Harry Higgins and Stephen Tomasin (all United States) and Kirill Golosnitskiy (Russia) made their international debuts.
 Todd Clever earned his 58th test cap to become the Eagles most capped player, surpassing Mike MacDonald.

Notes:
 Ciaran Hearn (Canada) and Lorenzo Cittadini (Italy) earned their 50th test caps.

See also
 Mid-year rugby union tests
 End-of-year rugby union tests
 2016 Africa Cup
 2016 World Rugby Nations Cup
 2016 Asian Rugby Championship
 2016 World Rugby Pacific Nations Cup
 2016 Sudamérica Rugby Cup
 2016 end-of-year rugby union internationals

References

2016
2015–16 in European rugby union
2015–16 in Japanese rugby union
2016 in Oceanian rugby union
2016 in South American rugby union
2016 in North American rugby union
2016 in African rugby union